Sha Tin Tau is a village in Tai Wai, Sha Tin District, Hong Kong. It is located east of Chun Shek Estate, north of Fung Shing Court and south of Tsang Tai Uk.

Administration
Sha Tin Tau is a recognized village under the New Territories Small House Policy.

History
Historically the only Hakka multi-surname village in the Sha Tin area, it was first settled by the Chan and later by the Law, the Lam, the Yip, the Lau and others. There are several ancestral halls in the village, including the Lau Ancestral Hall, that was built before 1900. The founding ancestor of the Lau clan of Sha Tin Tau village moved from Longchuan in the mid-19th century. The clan has lived there for nine generations by the early 21st century.

See also
 Lei Uk Tsuen (Sha Tin District)

References

External links

 Delineation of area of existing village Sha Tin Tau and Lee Uk (Sha Tin) for election of resident representative (2019 to 2022)
 Antiquities Advisory Board. Historic Building Appraisal. Lau Ancestral Hall, No. 40 Sha Tin Tau Pictures
 Antiquities Advisory Board. Historic Building Appraisal. High Rock Christian Camp, No. 102 Sha Tin Tau Village Pictures

Villages in Sha Tin District, Hong Kong
Tai Wai